The 2004 Stanford Cardinal football team represented Stanford University in the 2004 NCAA Division I-A football season. The team was led by head coach Buddy Teevens.

Schedule

Coaching staff

Buddy Teevens – Head coach
Bill Cubit – Offensive coordinator and quarterbacks
Jay Boulware – Running backs
Ken Margerum – Wide receivers
George McDonald – Tight ends
Steve Morton – Offensive line
A.J. Christoff – Defensive coordinator
Dave Tipton – Defensive tackles
Peter McCarty – Defensive ends
Tom Williams – Inside linebackers and associate head coach
Tom Quinn – Outside linebackers and special teams coordinator

Game summaries

BYU

Washington State

References

Stanford
Stanford Cardinal football seasons
Stanford Cardinal football